Eternal Love is a 1929 American silent romantic drama film directed by Ernst Lubitsch and starring John Barrymore and Camilla Horn. Based on the novel Der Koenig der Bernina by Jakob Christoph Heer, the film is about two lovers living in the Swiss Alps who struggle to be together and escape their loveless marriages. Eternal Love was the last silent film for both Lubitsch and Barrymore.

The story was remade as a 1957 Austrian film The King of Bernina.

Plot
In 1806 in the village of Pontresina, Switzerland, a mountain man named Marcus (John Barrymore) is in love with Ciglia (Camilla Horn), a young village woman who has been rejecting the advances of Lorenz (Victor Varconi). The mischievous Pia (Mona Rico) throws herself at Marcus, but she is also rejected. Marcus and Ciglia profess their love, while the jealous and vindictive Pia looks on.

Following the end of the French Army occupation, the people of Pontresina celebrate their liberation with a boisterous masked dance. At the party Ciglia becomes frightened of a drunken Marcus and she asks to be taken home. Marcus goes home confused. When Pia boldly attempts to seduce Marcus, he accepts her advances. The next day Ciglia receives permission from her uncle Tass (Hobart Bosworth) to marry Marcus. Pia and her mother approach Tass, and then confront Marcus. With Ciglia overhearing, they demand that Marcus marry Pia, who plays the cowering innocent. Ciglia leaves Marcus, and Marcus and Pia get married. Lorenz soon takes advantage of Ciglia and eventually they also get married.

During a heavy snowstorm, Pia is worried about Marcus and tries to form a rescue party to find him. With no one willing to join, she turns to Lorenz and Ciglia. Ciglia overreacts to the news, making Lorenz suspicious about her affections. Ciglia soon discovers Marcus safely arriving in the village. Consumed in jealously and sorrow, Lorenz confronts Marcus, urging him to leave the village, even offering him money, but Marcus refuses.

Later in the mountains, Lorenz ambushes Marcus and the two exchange gunfire. Marcus returns to the village, followed by the accusing and dying Lorenz. The villagers turn against Marcus despite Ciglia's cries of his innocence. Pia falsely accuses Ciglia of putting Marcus up to the murder of Lorenz. Soon the villagers turn into a mob and pursue Marcus and Ciglia into the mountains. With no other recourse, Marcus and Ciglia walk hand in hand into the path of an avalanche.

Cast
 John Barrymore as Marcus Baltran
 Camilla Horn as Ciglia
 Victor Varconi as Lorenz Gruber
 Mona Rico as Pia
 Hobart Bosworth as Reverend Tass
 Evelyn Selbie as Pia's mother
 Bodil Rosing as Housekeeper
 Constantine Romanoff as Villager (uncredited)

Production
Filming locations
 Lake Louise, Banff National Park, Alberta, Canada

Reception
In his review in The New York Times, Mordaunt Hall wrote, "Although it is capably acted and intelligently directed, with excellent scenic effects and settings, the story is not especially moving, which appears to be partly due to the sketchiness of the script." Hall found the acting to be generally good, describing Barrymore's work as "excellent" although having a "tendency to be too melodramatic". Hall described Horn's performance as "charmingly sympathetic, despite a touch too much of mascaro on her eyes". Finally, Hall applauded Lubitsch's Alpine scenes which he described as "realistic" and giving "a reasonably impressive conception of an avalanche during the closing stretches".

In his review of the DVD on filmcritic.com, Christopher Null wrote:

Preservation status
This film was thought to be lost until a 16 mm print was found in the film collection of Mary Pickford, and was released with its Vitaphone music-and-sound effects track in the 1990s. The film was given a DVD release on April 24, 2001.

References

External links
 
 

1929 films
1929 romantic drama films
American silent feature films
American black-and-white films
Films directed by Ernst Lubitsch
Films set in Switzerland
Films set in the Alps
Films set in the 1800s
United Artists films
Films produced by Joseph M. Schenck
1920s rediscovered films
1920s historical romance films
Films based on Swiss novels
American romantic drama films
American historical romance films
Rediscovered American films
1920s American films
Silent romantic drama films
Silent American drama films
1920s English-language films
Silent historical romance films